The FIBA Asia Champions Cup 2004 was the 15th staging of the FIBA Asia Champions Cup, the basketball club tournament of FIBA Asia. The tournament was held in Sharjah, United Arab Emirates between May 15 to 22, 2004. 

The Sagesse team from Lebanon was the first club to win three FIBA Asia Champions Cup titles after narrowly defeating the reigning champions Al-Wahda from Syria in the Final.

Preliminary round

Group A

Group B

Knockout round

Championship

5th–8th places

Quarterfinals

Semifinals

Finals

Final standings

References
2004 FIBA Champions Cup,  asia-basket.com

2004
2004 in Emirati sport
2003–04 in Asian basketball
International basketball competitions hosted by the United Arab Emirates